The 1998–99 Los Angeles Kings season was the Kings' 32nd season in the National Hockey League (NHL). This was the team's final season at the Great Western Forum before moving to the Staples Center for the 1999–2000 season. The Kings did not qualify for the 1999 playoffs, despite qualifying the previous year.

Off-season

Regular season

Final standings

Schedule and results

Player statistics

Awards and records

Transactions
The Kings were involved in the following transactions during the 1998–99 season.

Trades

Free agent signings

Free agents lost

Expansion draft

Waivers

Draft picks
Los Angeles's draft picks at the 1998 NHL Entry Draft held at the Marine Midland Arena in Buffalo, New York.

See also
1998–99 NHL season

References
Bibliography
 
 

L
L
Los Angeles Kings seasons
LA Kings
LA Kings